The prime minister of Mauritius is the head of government of Mauritius. He presides over the Cabinet of Ministers, which advises the president of the country and is collectively responsible to the National Assembly for any advice given and for all action done by or under the authority of any minister in the execution of his office.

The position is the most powerful constitutional office of the country. This is mainly because the office is amalgamated with other functions whereby conventions, the office holder is also the Minister of Defense & Home Affairs (which makes the office holder responsible for law & order, internal security, defense, the armed forces and intelligence services), the Leader of the National Assembly (which makes the office holder responsible for setting the agenda for parliament) and Minister for Rodrigues & Dependencies (which makes the office holder responsible for + occupancy, administration of local dependencies & their defense). It is also inter-alia, the head of government and presides over the cabinet of Ministers. It is second in the order of precedence just after the president and enjoys relative importance in the public as the office holder is usually the leader of the party/alliance that wins an election.

The current prime minister of Mauritius, Pravind Jugnauth, leader of the MSM, was appointed by the president on 23 January 2017 following the resignation of his father and coalition leader Sir Anerood Jugnauth who held the post following victory of his Alliance in the 2014 General Election. The official residence of the prime minister during his term in office is the Clarisse House, the Prime Minister's Office is located in Port Louis. The longest serving prime minister is Anerood Jugnauth who held the office for 19 years as prime minister.

Overview

The current Prime Minister's portfolio includes, inter-alia, the following:
 Law and Order
 Civil Status, Citizenship
 External Communications
 Electoral Commissions and Electoral Affairs
 Government Information Services
 Meteorological Services
 Mauritius Oceanography Institute
 Human Rights
 Strategic Policy

The prime minister is appointed by the president. The prime minister holds the second most senior position in the country, second only to the president. The prime minister is usually the leader of the largest party in the ruling coalition. The position of Prime Minister along with the office of Deputy Prime Minister is specified under CHAPTER VI Section 59 Part 1 of the Constitution of Mauritius.

After the country became a Republic on 12 March 1992, the President became the Head of State. The President holds prerogative powers which includes summoning, prorogation and dissolution of parliament including appointment of the Prime Minister and Cabinet. The Prime Minister has the constitutional duty to advise him/her when to exercise these prerogatives.

History

Pre-Independence
During the British Mauritius period, it was the Chief Minister who was the head of government, executive powers was vested by the Governor, representative of the Monarch. The only Chief Minister which the country had known was Sir Seewoosagur Ramgoolam, from 26 September 1961 to 12 March 1968.

Independence
The office of the Prime Minister of Mauritius was created on 12 March 1968 when Mauritius became an independent state. Queen Elizabeth II remained as head of state as Queen of Mauritius, with her executive powers in Mauritius delegated to the governor-general.

After the 1967 General Election, Sir Seewoosagur Ramgoolam (SSR) became the first Prime Minister of Mauritius, he was re-elected in the 1976 General Election and remained in office. In the 1982 General Election, Sir Anerood Jugnauth (SAJ) coalition was elected, he became Prime Minister. However his alliance broke up in 1983 and the 1983 General Election was held, SAJ formed another alliance, he was elected again and remain in office. In the 1987 General Election, another coalition concluded by SAJ won again, he remained in office. SAJ also won the 1991 General Election and remained the Prime Minister of Mauritius. The new leader of the Labour Party Dr. Navin Ramgoolam, became the Leader of the Opposition.

Republic
After the country became a Republic on 12 March 1992, the President became the Head of State. The President holds prerogative powers which includes summoning, prorogation and dissolution of parliament including appointment of the Prime Minister and Cabinet. The Prime Minister has the constitutional duty to advise him/her when to exercise these prerogatives.

On 12 March 1992, Mauritius became a Republic State, with a new constitution in 1992, the terms of the General Elections was regulated to 5 years. Since then, each 5 years elections take place and a new Prime Minister is elected. After the 1995 General Election, Dr. Navin Ramgoolam became Prime Minister of Mauritius for the first time. However, he lost the 2000 General Election. In 2000, the Prime Minister's office was shared between two leaders, Sir Anerood Jugnauth spent 3 years as Prime Minister and Paul Bérenger spent 2 years. After the 2005 General Election, Dr. Navin Ramgoolam became the Prime Minister of Mauritius again. In 2010 General Election, he was re-elected and remained in office. The 2014 General Election returned Sir Anerood Jugnauth to the Prime Minister's office.

Oaths
According to the third Schedule of the Constitution of Mauritius, an oath under this section shall be administered by the Prime Minister.

See also

 Spouse of the prime minister of Mauritius
 List of prime ministers of Mauritius
 President of Mauritius
 Deputy Prime Minister of Mauritius
 Vice Prime Minister of Mauritius
 Leader of the Opposition (Mauritius)
 Government of Mauritius

References

Government of Mauritius
Mauritian politicians
History of Mauritius
 
1968 establishments in Mauritius